Yuen Tsun Nam (born 24 May 1991) is a Hong Kong footballer who plays for Hong Kong First Division League club Wing Yee as a defender. His twins brother Yuen Tsun Tung is also a professional footballer, currently plays for Wing Yee as well.

Club career

Early career
Yuen Tsun Nam joined famous Hong Kong football academy Rangers (HKG) youth team in 2007. After spending two and a half seasons in Rangers, he joined Yuen Long youth team in 2010.

TSW Pegasus
He signed his first professional contract with TSW Pegasus before the start of 2010–11 season. However, he was not given too many playing chances. He featured two league matches and one cup match only. He spent most of the time in the reserves team.

In the 2011–12 season, since there were many players on his position, he only got limited playing chances. Same as last season, he featured two league matches and one cup match only. In January 2012, he was loaned to Hong Kong Sapling, where he played six matches in overall. He returned to TSW Pegasus at the end of season.

Sunray Cave JC Sun Hei
In July 2012, he joined AFC Cup participant Sunray Cave JC Sun Hei, since the club claimed that they wanted a younger team.

Career statistics

Club
 As of 25 December 2016.

References

External links
 
 Yuen Tsun Nam at HKFA

1991 births
Living people
Association football defenders
Hong Kong footballers
Hong Kong First Division League players
TSW Pegasus FC players
Dreams Sports Club players
Sun Hei SC players
Hong Kong Rangers FC players